Gob or GOB may refer to:

Government 
 Government of Bahrain
 Government of Bangladesh
 Government of Barbados
 Government of Belarus
 Government of Belize
 Government of Brazil

Music
 Gob (band), a Canadian punk band
 Gob (Gob album), 1994
 Gob (Dels album), 2011

People
 Art Gob (born 1937), American football player
 Nicolas Gob (born 1982), Belgian actor
 Garland Buckeye (1897-1975), nicknamed Gob, American baseball and football player

Other uses
 Gob Bluth, a fictional character on the TV show Arrested Development
 GObject Builder, an object preprocessor for GObject/C
 GOB, station code of Gobowen railway station, England
 Going out of business
 Good ol' boy
 Grand Orient of Belgium, a Belgian cupola of masonic lodges
 Robe Airport, in Bale Robe, Ethiopia
 Whoopie pie, also known as gob, a baked dessert food
 Coal refuse from coal mining